Michael James Grace (born June 20, 1970), is an American former professional baseball pitcher. He played all or part of five seasons in Major League Baseball (MLB), from  through , all for the Philadelphia Phillies.

External links

1970 births
Living people
Bradley Braves baseball players
Major League Baseball pitchers
Baseball players from Illinois
Philadelphia Phillies players
Sportspeople from Joliet, Illinois
Batavia Clippers players
Chattanooga Lookouts players
Reading Phillies players
Rochester Red Wings players
Scranton/Wilkes-Barre Red Barons players
Spartanburg Phillies players
Anchorage Glacier Pilots players